Nikita is an American action thriller drama television series that aired on The CW from September 9, 2010, to December 27, 2013, in the United States. The series is an adaptation of Luc Besson's French film La Femme Nikita, the second such adaptation after the 1997 TV series La Femme Nikita.

The series focuses on Nikita (Maggie Q), a woman who escaped from a secret government-funded organization known as  "Division" and, after a three-year hiding period, is back to bring down the organization. The main cast in various seasons features Q, Lyndsy Fonseca, Shane West, Aaron Stanford, Melinda Clarke, Xander Berkeley, Noah Bean, Tiffany Hines, Ashton Holmes, Dillon Casey, and Devon Sawa.

Plot

The series focuses on Nikita Mears, a woman who escaped from a secret U.S. government-funded organization known as Division, and after spending three years in hiding, is back to bring Division down. Division, created and supervised by an organization called Oversight, is responsible for black operations including espionage, sabotage, and assassination. Under the leadership of its first director and founding member, Percival "Percy" Rose, Division has gone rogue and performs under-the-table murder-for-hire. To protect himself, Percy has created a series of 'black boxes', hard drives containing every job Division has ever done, as leverage to prevent Oversight from removing him and/or ending Division. Percy's black boxes are hidden in secret locations around the world, under the protection of Guardians, high-ranking Division agents.

Division fills its ranks primarily by recruiting young people with troubled backgrounds, often directly from prison. Division fakes the recruits' deaths, erases all evidence of their past lives, and molds them into efficient spies and assassins. The recruits generally do not have the freedom to leave the agency. Recruits may be "cancelled" (killed) if their progress is deemed unsatisfactory, and to this end, Division implants the recruits with tracking devices and kill chips.

Nikita was recruited by Division when she was a deeply troubled teenager, on death row. Division rescued her, faked her death, and told her she was getting a second chance to start a new life and serve her country. Throughout her grueling training, Nikita never lost her humanity. Once she graduated from recruit to field agent, she broke Division rules by falling in love with a civilian, to whom she became engaged and planned to run away. When Division found out and assassinated Nikita's fiancé, Nikita went rogue. She makes it her mission to bring down Division, as a way to avenge her fiancé and atone for the sins she committed as a Division agent. Percy orders Michael, the Division operative who trained Nikita, to deal with her.
 
On the outside, Nikita trains a young woman named Alex, who as a child was saved by Nikita during a mission that killed Alex's father years ago. Nikita has Alex become a recruit inside Division, working as a mole to gain intelligence. Throughout season one, Nikita works to disrupt Division's operations, with the support of Alex's intelligence from the inside. Nikita also encounters Gogol, a Russian security department operative and established enemy of Division. Nikita slowly brings other allies to her side, including Michael when he realizes the true extent of Percy's corruption as well as his own feelings for Nikita. At the end of the season, Nikita manages to foil Percy's plan to take over the CIA and gain its top-secret funding. However, she is forced to go on the run with Michael. At the same time, Nikita loses Alex when Alex discovers that Nikita killed her father on the Division mission years ago. When Alex is exposed as Nikita's mole and finds herself at the mercy of Division and Oversight, Amanda offers Alex a deal: help Division stop Nikita, and Division will help Alex bring down the man who ordered the hit on her father.
 
In season two, Nikita and Michael focus and press their efforts against Oversight, seeking to destroy the group, which will also cripple Division at the same time. Division has changed, with Percy being locked up for his actions in season one, and Amanda taking control of the organization, with Oversight supervising her. Alex has set her sights on Sergei Semak, her father's right-hand man and also the one responsible for ordering his death, who has taken over Zetrov, her father's company and controller of Gogol. Nikita and Michael manage to expose and/or kill most of Oversight, with the help of Seymour Birkhoff, a former Division head technician, who left the organization after Percy was imprisoned. While trying to bring down Oversight, Nikita and Michael hunt down the remaining black boxes, finally destroying all but one. The final black box has fallen into the hands of Gogol's leader, Ari Tasarov, who is later revealed to be Amanda's lover and exposes her as a traitor. With the help of the last of the Guardians, Percy escapes his prison and manages to overthrow Amanda's control of Division, sending Ari and her into hiding, along with the last black box. Percy also manages to kill all members of Oversight and puts a plan into place to use plutonium to gain membership of an unknown group of powerful people. Having no other choice, Nikita and Michael decide to take the situation to the president, with the help of Ryan, who has been helping Nikita on her mission since season one. Alex reconciles with Nikita, after having finally brought down Semak and restored her father's company. While her allies attempt to stop Percy's most trusted man, Roan, from using the plutonium to blow up Washington, DC, Nikita and Michael infiltrate Division, managing to expose Percy's corruption and evil deeds, ending his leadership over the organization. Percy is killed by Nikita after trying to escape, and Roan is killed by Alex before he could set off the plutonium. The vice president assigns Ryan as the new director of Division and gives Nikita the task of hunting down Amanda and the last of Division's agents who have gone rogue.

Cast and characters
Characters are listed in order of title credit and by appearance on the show.

The series borrows many characters, or at least their names, from the 1997 television series La Femme Nikita, which was also based on the French film La Femme Nikita. The reboot, however, was clearly equally inspired by the highly similar movie "Salt" (starring Angelina Jolie) that came out two months earlier in July 2010. Maggie Q portrays Nikita, the protagonist and a former spy and assassin who has gone rogue and now plans to bring down Division. Q also performs her own stunts. Shane West plays Michael, a Division operative who trained Nikita. He sees Division and its recruits as a kind of family to him, the complete opposite of Amanda, portrayed by Melinda Clarke, Division's psychologist, interrogator, and a master manipulator. Seymour Birkhoff, Division's computer genius and head technician, is portrayed by Aaron Stanford. The head of Division is Percy, played by Xander Berkeley.

In the season one finale, the audience is introduced to a Senator Madeline Pierce, played by Alberta Watson, who also played the part of Madeline in the former La Femme Nikita television series (Madeline was that series' counterpart to Amanda). Lyndsy Fonseca portrays Alexandra "Alex" Udinov, a former sex slave and drug addict who was arrested after a robbery and later became Division's newest recruit. She is also a mole whom Nikita is using to destroy Division from the inside. Other recruits include Jaden (Tiffany Hines) and Thom (Ashton Holmes) but their characters are later killed off by Nathan (Thad Luckinbill) and Alex respectively. Dillon Casey portrays the role of Sean Pierce, a former Navy SEAL sent to Division directly from Oversight. Noah Bean portrays Ryan Fletcher, an agent in the CIA, but later takes over Division. Some other notable recurring characters include Ari Tasarov (Peter Outerbridge), Sergei Semak (Peter J. Lucas), Roan (Rob Stewart), and Nathan Colville (Thad Luckinbill).

Main
 Maggie Q as Nikita Mears: The show's central protagonist and titular character, Nikita is a spy and assassin who has vowed to destroy the secret agency that trained her: Division. She is the mentor and close confidant of Alex, and she is a former protege of Amanda. She gains close ties with majority of the people she works with, such as Michael - who eventually becomes her love interest - Seymour Birkhoff, Owen Elliot and Ryan Fletcher.
 Shane West as Michael Bishop: An ex-Division agent who fell in love with Nikita and joined forces with her to destroy his former employers.
 Lyndsy Fonseca as Alexandra "Alex" Udinov: The young woman Nikita rescued the night Division killed her family. She trained to destroy Division, and she also seeks revenge against Division for the massacre of her family. She is Amanda's former protege and Nikita's very close friend.
 Aaron Stanford as Seymour Birkhoff/Lionel Peller: A computer genius, hacker, and nonconformist. Former employee of Division until he sided with Nikita in order to bring order to the underworld of black ops and corrupted crimes.
 Ashton Holmes as Thom: A Division assassin who was recruited before Alex.
 Tiffany Hines as Jaden: A Division assassin who was recruited before Alex.
 Melinda Clarke as Helen "Amanda" Collins: The show's main antagonist in the third and fourth season, Amanda is a master manipulator, interrogator, and psychologist. She is also a former head of Division as well as an enemy and former mentor of Nikita and Alex.
 Xander Berkeley as Percival "Percy" Rose: The show's main antagonist in the first and second season, Percy is the former head of Division who involves his government access with black market crimes and assassination of powerful people around the world.
 Dillon Casey as Sean Pierce: A former Navy SEAL hired to keep an eye on Division and the activities that take place.
 Devon Sawa as Owen Elliot/Sam Matthews: A former Division cleaner and Guardian who turns against the company.
 Noah Bean as Ryan Fletcher: A former CIA agent and analyst who is a close ally of Nikita. He was appointed the new head of Division in season three to clean up the company's history.

Recurring
 Rob Stewart as Roan (seasons 1–2): Cleaner of Division and Percy's right-hand man.
 Peter Outerbridge as Ari Tasarov (seasons 1–3): Former head of GOGOL, a Russian Division counterpart, and Amanda's former love interest.
 Thad Luckinbill as Nathan Colville (season 1): Alex's neighbor and love interest following her graduation from Division.
 Alberta Watson as Madeline Pierce (guest star season 1; recurring season 2): A U.S. Senator, former member of Oversight and mother of Sean Pierce.
 Lyndie Greenwood as Sonya (seasons 2–4): The head technician of Division since Birkhoff's leave and former subordinate of Amanda.
 Helena Mattsson as Cassandra Ovechkin (season 2): Former GOGOL agent and mother of Michael's son, Max.
 Peter J. Lucas as Sergei Semak (season 2): The CEO of Zetrov and head of GOGOL.
 Cameron Daddo as Charles Grayson (season 2): The former President of the United States.
 Michelle Nolden as Kathleen Spencer (seasons 2–4): The Vice President of the United States, later succeeded Charles Grayson as president.
 David S. Lee as Phillip Jones (season 2 & 4; guest season 3): Former CFO of M.D.K. Industries and a high-ranked member of The Invisible Hand.
 Sarah Allen as Anne (season 3): Former Division agent and Amanda's subordinate.
 Richard T. Jones as Evan Danforth (season 3): Former commander in the U.S. Navy and Special Advisor to President Kathleen Spencer.

Series overview

Season 1 (2010–2011)

At the beginning of season one, two people break into a drug store and attempt to rob it. While stealing the drugs and trying to make a get-away, the owner challenges one of the robbers. When this robber hesitates in shooting the owner of the store, their partner doubles back to shoot him before quickly running off, leaving the remaining individual to be arrested when the police show up. Once the police arrive, they pull off the individual's mask and discover that the robber is a young female who is revealed to be Alex. As she is being brought into prison, she fights the prison guards with good strength; she does not know that Michael, a Division operative, is watching. He later processes her into Division, a covert unit of the government that has gone rogue. Division recruits young and susceptible criminals into their training program and forces them to carry out their missions under penalty of death. The higher-up members of Division are worried because Nikita has come back online, meaning that she is targeting Division from the outside. What is worse is that she has a mole inside; however, at this point in the show no one in Division is aware of it. By the end of the first episode, it is revealed that this mole is in fact Alex. Halfway through the season, it is revealed that the second robber in the drug store was Nikita and that the robbery was set up specifically to attract Division's attention, so that they would recruit Alex. The two communicate through a chat program Nikita created while still at Division called the shellbox program.

As the series progresses, Nikita routinely sabotages missions that would have been major successes for Division and also saves the lives of recruits such as Sarah. More light is shed on the lives of the main characters through flashbacks, and it is revealed that Alex was sold into sex trafficking by a man who had been close to her oligarch father before his murder at the hands of Division.

Eventually, Michael joins Nikita's cause after she helps him find Kasim Tariq. He tells her a story of how he had once found the perfect home for his now-deceased wife and daughter. Tariq took that dream away from him when he killed both of them with a car bomb that was intended for Michael.

Alex is forced to kill her rival, Jaden, after Nathan (Alex's neighbor and love interest) accidentally reveals in front of her that Alex has told him of her true occupation as an assassin. Back at Division, Amanda tells Alex that Division now operates with new cochlear implants that are virtually undetectable by even the wearers, and Jaden's implant recorded Alex calling Nikita shortly after she killed Jaden. At this time, Division finds out that Alex is Nikita's mole and is thus interrogated. It is revealed that Alex's family was killed by a Division strike team and that Nikita was the agent who killed her father. This revelation turns Alex against Nikita. Michael is locked away in Division as well after attempting to help Alex escape.

Michael escapes courtesy of Birkhoff (Division's head technician) and joins Nikita who had just escaped from the CIA headquarters. As the season ends, it is shown that Amanda has disabled Alex's killchip and wants to recruit her into Oversight (Division's leadership and funding stream). Michael and Nikita try not to worry about the future as they drive off into the oncoming storm.

Season 2 (2011–2012)

At the end of season one, Nikita and Alex's relationship had been shattered. There is tension between them and Alex has a difficult time trusting Nikita again. Meanwhile, Nikita and Michael's relationship was restored. Now that they're on their own, Nikita and Michael are on the run with a hard drive called "the black box". It contains Division's darkest secrets and conspiracies, which include 6 government agents' dirty secrets. Together, they plan to right the wrongs that Division has committed over the years, one mission at a time. The season ends with Nikita killing Percy, and taking over Division with the help of Ryan Fletcher under request of the president.

Season 3 (2012–2013)

Division is now officially under government control, under the leadership of Ryan Fletcher, tasked with hunting down rogue agents, nicknamed the "Dirty Thirty", who refused the recall order. Division discovers the mysterious group Percy was seeking to join. Amanda has gone rogue. Sean Pierce dies during a mutiny at Division. Amanda frames Nikita for the murder of the President of the United States, leaving her to clear her name while the whole world is looking for her. They also burn down Division and find another place to live, those who are still left to do the last mission: Nikita, Michael, Alex, Birkoff, Sonya and Fletcher.

Season 4 (2013)

Nikita goes rogue on her own, leaving the team behind. The first episode picks up a few months down the line where Nikita is being framed for the murder of the President. It is soon discovered that Amanda and the Group have created exact human replicas of high-power government officials, dubbed the "Doubles", who are subject to the group's rule. Nikita and the team try to clear her name leaving destruction behind. Michael and Nikita's relationship has hit a rocky patch after Nikita abandons the team to protect them from involvement in the investigation of the president's murder. Alex is on a mission to save the world and also clear Nikita's name, encountering old enemies along the way.

In the second half of the six-episode season, The Group's headquarters is destroyed, leaving the team to believe that Amanda and her co-conspirators are dead. After being abducted by the presumed-dead Amanda, Fletcher leaps out of a window as a last resort and soon after succumbs to his injuries, but not before whispering to Nikita that both Amanda and her Doubles are still very much alive. The team comes together for one last mission: to bring down Amanda and the Doubles. Nikita and Alex begin to kill off the remaining clones contrary to Michael's will.

At their final stop on their path of destruction, Nikita and Alex obtain a list of all of the Doubles, which is sent out to the news outlets and Birkhoff's secure server. Nikita, Alex, and Birkhoff are arrested and placed in a maximum-security prison, where Amanda visits Nikita to say goodbye. After Nikita breaks free in front of Amanda, she places her in the restraints and reveals that no one was, in fact, killed on their final mission. Nikita and Alex had actually used tranquilizer bullets instead of live ammunition on the remaining heads of the Group (or "The Shop") and had faked the deaths of the others as well.

Meanwhile. Michael and Sam release the real, original officials. Nikita explains how in every step of the way, her main goal was to get face-to-face with Amanda and kill her. However, she has changed her mind and would rather see Amanda suffer imprisonment for life and never be heard from again. She walks out as Amanda begins screaming in protest, the door closing behind her.

We then see where the characters have ultimately headed in their new lives of freedom. Birkhoff has released Shadownet to the general public to safeguard them from the government's prying eyes and, although not seen, Birkhoff mentions that Sonya is waiting for him in London. Alex is touring the country as a spokesperson and Sam is her bodyguard/head of security. The happily married Nikita and Michael are residing on a beach in Ecuador where they can continue to work on their own small missions together, helping innocent people in need.

Production

Conception

The CW had long been interested in an action-adventure series centered on a strong female character. On January 27, 2010, The CW ordered a pilot episode of Nikita. The 2010 television series is more closely tied to Luc Besson's 1990 French film Nikita than the 1997 television series, La Femme Nikita. However, the series does borrow many characters, or at least character names, from the previous television series.

Development
During the 2010 Television Critics Association press tour in Los Angeles on July 29, 2010, executive producer Craig Silverstein said he was approached by Warner Bros. who owned the rights. Silverstein said, "My first thought was I love Nikita. My second thought was, 'it's been done.' Could it be done fresh? Could we have a take where you didn't know where this story would end?" As a result, two major changes were made, one of which was the decision to have the story take place after Nikita has escaped. Maggie Q stated, "No one's told her story after the fact. No one knows where she is going." In addition, a new character, Alex, is introduced who has an unexpected backstory. The series is a mix of a weekly missions and counter-missions, along with a story arc running through the first season that explores Nikita's relationships with Alex and Michael.

While presenting its 2010–11 season schedule on May 21, 2010, The CW officially confirmed the pick-up of the series and announced its intention to air Nikita after The Vampire Diaries on Thursday nights. In October 2010, Entertainment Weekly announced that the series would receive some tweaking to attract more of a female audience, including a new character and potential love interest for Nikita. However, the network promised the core of the show would remain the same. Later that month, the show was picked up for a full season, which would total 22 episodes. The CW have admitted they took gambles this year but said they were "thrilled that [it] paid off for us".

On May 17, 2011 Nikita was renewed for a second season by The CW in the 2011–12 fall season. It was later announced that they would move the show to Friday nights at 8:00 p.m., pairing it with Supernatural, beginning Fall 2011. The second season premiered on Friday, September 23, 2011.

On May 11, 2012, The CW renewed the series for a full third season.

On May 9, 2013, The CW renewed the series for a shortened fourth and final season. The final season consisted of just six episodes and was produced to complete the storyline and make it more desirable for a Netflix audience.

Casting

In February 2010, Maggie Q was cast as Nikita. Executive producer Silverstein said casting Q was a simple and quick process, because they wanted someone who was beautiful, and could fight, and who you could believe holding a gun at the same time, and she was perfect. Later that month, Shane West was cast as Michael. In March, Lyndsy Fonseca was given the role of Alex. Silverstein commented the casting of Fonseca, saying she came in at the last moment but was cast because they liked her intensity. Later that month, Tiffany Hines was cast as Jaden and Xander Berkeley was added to the cast as Percy. In October 2010, Noah Bean gained a recurring role as Ryan Fletcher, a CIA case officer and analyst.

Casting for the second season started in July 2011 when Dillon Casey was cast as Sean Pierce, a former U.S. Navy Special Warfare Development Group (DEVGRU, formerly Seal Team Six) officer contracted to monitor Amanda's work at Division and recover the stolen black boxes. Casey was later promoted as a series regular.

After being recurring cast members for two seasons, Noah Bean and Devon Sawa were made series regulars for the third season.

Crew

Filming locations
Although the show is set in and around New Jersey, Nikita is primarily filmed in Canada—specifically, in Toronto and elsewhere in Ontario. Much of the show is filmed on location, but studio shooting is also used for sets such as 'Division' and the penthouse. Many landmark locations used on the show, such as the White House, are actually doubles meant to represent various places in North America. The series officially wrapped production on October 1, 2013.

Reception

Critical response

On the review aggregation website Rotten Tomatoes, the series holds an approval rating of 85% over the series four seasons. The first seasons critics' consensus reads: "Building on Maggie Q's strong central performance, Nikita is a strong spy thriller that's sleek and action-packed (if a little heavy with backstory)." Metacritic gave it a score of 69/100 based on 30 critics reviews, indicating "generally favorable reviews". Comparisons were made to Joss Whedon's Dollhouse and the ABC spy drama Alias. Critics had praise for Maggie Q in the lead role, the look of the show, solid action sequences, the chemistry between the cast especially between the two leads Q and West, and an intriguing twist at the end, but noted that the dialogue needed some humor.

Ratings

U.S. Nielsen ratings
The pilot episode drew 3.57 million viewers on its initial broadcast. The CW broadcast an encore of the pilot the following day, which drew approximately 2.6 million viewers. The finale was seen by 1.94 million viewers. The first season averaged 2.40 million viewers and a 0.9 18–49 rating in live + same day DVR viewing per episode. Season 2 averaged a 0.5 18-49 rating using Nielsen Live + Same Day DVR data.

The following is a table for the seasonal rankings, based on average total estimated viewers per episode, of Nikita on The CW. "Rank" refers to how Nikita rated compared to the other television series that aired during prime time hours.

International ratings
In the UK, the show was the most watched show for Sky Living every week that its autumn episodes aired. When it returned from hiatus in the summer in a new Wednesday 9:00 PM slot, it finished fourth in the week. However, it was able to increase again in the following weeks.

In the Netherlands the series premiered with solid ratings, the first episode drew an audience of 640,000 viewers. The second episode was broadcast right after the first episode and drew 757,000 viewers, it had a market share of 10.3%. With these numbers Nikita was the 4th most watched channel of the evening.

In France the series premiered with high ratings in its 11:20 p.m. timeslot, the first episode drew an audience of 2.4 million viewers. The show obtained an audience share of 22.6% of France's population which is an extremely high rating despite its timeslot.

In Bulgaria the series averaged 663,000 viewers and was placed at number 12 in the ratings for July.

Awards and accolades
The series earned numerous award nominations from awards shows and entertainment organizations such as the American Society of Cinematographers, the People's Choice Awards, the Teen Choice Awards and the 63rd Primetime Emmy Awards.

Promotion

The show was promoted through pop-culture conventions such as Comic-Con from 2010 to 2013.

Release

Broadcast
In the United States, the show aired on The CW. In December 2020, it was also released to the network's streaming platform, CW Seed, accessible to U.S. audiences.

Sky Living secured the rights to air Nikita in the United Kingdom as the centerpiece of the channel's autumn schedule. Living's head of acquisitions Amy Barham said "Nikita is the hottest, most action-packed drama of the season with an amazingly strong female lead that we know will excite and engage Living's audiences this autumn. We're thrilled to be able to bring it exclusively to the channel. Chase will follow in 2011, providing a new favorite show for all of our procedural fans."

In Australia, the show aired on Fox8. In New Zealand, Nikita was shown on TV2 at 10:30 pm on Thursdays. In Canada, it aired on CTV Two and started airing the same day as in the U.S.

In Greece and Cyprus, Nikita aired on Star and ANT1, respectively.

Home media
Home releases of the series are distributed through Warner Bros. Home Video.

Other media
A 3D action game based on the TV series titled Nikita Spy Training was released on iOS and Android. It featured sneaking, shooting, and getting in and out of drivable vehicles in the style of open world top-down open world games. The game has since been removed from both marketplaces.

Reboot
In February 2020, it was announced that a Nikita reboot series was in the early stages of development.

See also
 Point of No Return (film)

References

External links
 

 
2010 American television series debuts
2010s American crime drama television series
2013 American television series endings
American action television series
American thriller television series
The CW original programming
Television franchises
English-language television shows
Espionage television series
Martial arts television series
Serial drama television series
Live action television shows based on films
Television shows filmed in Toronto
Television series by Warner Bros. Television Studios
Television series by Wonderland Sound and Vision
Television shows set in New Jersey
Television shows set in Ontario
Television shows set in Toronto
Canadian thriller television series